Samuel Richard "Sandy" Berger (October 28, 1945 – December 2, 2015) was an attorney who served as the 18th US National Security Advisor for US President Bill Clinton from 1997 to 2001 after he had served as the Deputy National Security Advisor for the Clinton administration from 1993 to 1997.

In 2005, he was fined and sentenced to two years of probation, plus community service, for the unauthorized removal of classified material from the National Archives. He gave up his license to practice law.

Early life
Berger was born to a Jewish family in Millerton, New York, where his parents ran a surplus store. He graduated from Webutuck High School in 1963, earned his Bachelor of Arts degree in government from Cornell University in 1967, and his earned Juris Doctor degree from Harvard Law School in 1971.

At Cornell, Berger was a member of the Quill and Dagger society with Paul Wolfowitz and Stephen Hadley. Opposed to the Vietnam War, Berger began working for Senator George McGovern's presidential campaign in 1972. While there, he met Bill Clinton, forming a friendship that lasted for decades. Berger later urged Clinton to run for President of the United States.

After the McGovern campaign, Berger gained experience working in a variety of government posts, including serving as Special Assistant to Mayor of New York City John Lindsay and Legislative Assistant to U.S. Senator Harold Hughes of Iowa and Congressman Joseph Resnick of New York. He was also Deputy Director of Policy Planning for the U.S. Department of State from 1977 to 1980 under Secretary of State Cyrus Vance during the Carter administration.

After leaving the State Department, Berger went on to join the law firm Hogan & Hartson where he helped expand the firm's international law practice. As a partner, he opened the firm's first two international offices, in London and Brussels. "Sandy Berger", Nancy Pelosi said in 1997, "was the point-man at ... Hogan & Hartson ... for the trade office of the Chinese government. He was a lawyer-lobbyist."

Clinton administration

Berger served as Senior Foreign Policy Advisor to Governor Clinton during the campaign, and as Assistant Transition Director for National Security of the 1992 Clinton-Gore Transition. Berger served eight years on the National Security Council staff, first from 1993 to 1997 as deputy national security advisor, under Anthony Lake, whom Berger had recommended for the role, and then succeeding Lake as Assistant to the President for National Security Affairs from 1997 to 2001.

Berger was a central figure in formulating the foreign policy of the Clinton Administration, and played an integral role advancing the administration's self-described objectives of advancing "democracy, shared prosperity, and peace." In President Clinton's words, "Nobody was more knowledgeable about policy or smarter about how to formulate it.  He was both great in analyzing a situation and figuring out what to do about it. His gifts proved invaluable time and time again, in Latin America, the Balkans, Northern Ireland, and the Middle East."

Key achievements during Berger's NSC tenure included the 1995 peso recovery package in Mexico, NATO enlargement, Operation Desert Fox, the Dayton Accords that ended the civil conflict in Bosnia, the NATO bombing campaign against Yugoslavia, the Good Friday Agreement that helped bring about peace in Northern Ireland, and the administration's policy of engagement  with the People's Republic of China. In a March 2005 oral history interview at the University of Virginia's Miller Center, Berger noted, "I think during the '90s we took China from outside the international system and brought it inside the international system, partly through trade, and economics, and otherwise."

On July 4, 1999, in what South Asia expert Bruce Reidel called Berger's "finest hour," Berger advised President Clinton through a pivotal negotiation with Pakistan's prime minister Nawaz Sharif to pull that country's troops back from Kashmir, averting a potentially cataclysmic nuclear war with India.

Berger also advised the President regarding the Khobar Towers bombing and responses to the terrorist bombings of American embassies in Kenya and Tanzania. In the final years of the Clinton administration, combating terrorism was the paramount foreign policy priority; Berger said in his March 2005 oral history interview at UVA's Miller Center, "I said to Condoleezza Rice during the transition ... that the number-one issue that she would deal with as national security advisor was terrorism in general and al-Qaeda specifically."

Controversies

Stock ownership
In November 1997, Berger paid a $23,000 civil penalty to settle conflict of interest allegations stemming from his failure to sell his stock of Amoco Corporation as ordered by the White House. Berger was advised by the White House to sell the stock in early 1994. He said he had planned to sell the stock, but then forgot. He denied knowingly participating in decisions in which he had a financial interest. With no evidence that Berger intended to break the law, the United States Department of Justice determined a civil penalty was adequate for a "non-willful violation" of the conflict of interest law.

Chinese nuclear espionage

In 1999, Berger was criticized for failing to promptly inform President Clinton of his knowledge that the People's Republic of China had managed to acquire the designs of a number of U.S. nuclear warheads. Berger was originally briefed of the espionage by the Department of Energy (DOE) in April 1996, but did not inform the president until July 1997.

A number of Republicans, including then presidential hopeful Lamar Alexander, called for Berger's resignation. They accused him of ignoring the allegations of Chinese espionage. "For his unwillingness to act on this serious matter, Mr. Berger should resign", Alexander said. "If he does not, he should be relieved of his duties by President Clinton." President Clinton rejected the calls: "The record is that we acted aggressively," Clinton said. "Mr. Berger acted appropriately."

Unauthorized removal and destruction of classified material

On July 19, 2004, it was revealed that the United States Department of Justice was investigating Berger for unauthorized removal of classified documents in October 2003 from a National Archives reading room prior to testifying before the 9/11 Commission.  The documents were five classified copies of a single report commissioned from Richard Clarke covering internal assessments of the Clinton Administration's handling of the unsuccessful 2000 millennium attack plots. An associate of Berger said Berger took one copy in September 2003 and four copies in October 2003, allegedly by stuffing the documents into his socks and pants. Berger subsequently lied to investigators when questioned about the removal of the documents.

In April 2005, Berger pleaded guilty to a misdemeanor charge of unauthorized removal and retention of classified material from the National Archives in Washington, D.C.

Berger was fined $50,000, sentenced to serve two years of probation and 100 hours of community service, and stripped of his security clearance for three years. The Justice Department initially said Berger only stole copies of classified documents and not originals, but the House Government Reform Committee later revealed that an unsupervised Berger had been given access to classified files of original, uncopied, uninventoried documents on terrorism. During the House Government Reform Committee hearings, Nancy Kegan Smith — who was the director of the presidential documents staff at the National Archives and Records Administration — acknowledged that she had granted Berger access to original materials in her office.

On December 20, 2006, Inspector General Paul Brachfeld reported that Berger took a break to go outside without an escort. "In total, during this visit, he removed four documents ... Mr. Berger said he placed the documents under a trailer in an accessible construction area outside Archives 1 (the main Archives building)". Berger acknowledged having later retrieved the documents from the construction area and returned with them to his office.

On May 17, 2007, Berger relinquished his license to practice law as a result of the Justice Department investigation. Saying, "I have decided to voluntarily relinquish my license. ... While I derived great satisfaction from years of practicing law, I have not done so for 15 years and do not envision returning to the profession. I am very sorry for what I did, and I deeply apologize." By giving up his license, Berger avoided cross-examination by the Bar Counsel regarding details of his thefts.

Post-government

After leaving the Clinton Administration, Berger became chairman of Stonebridge International, an international advisory firm he co-founded in 2001 which focused on aiding companies in their expansion into emerging markets such as Brazil, China, India, and Russia. Stonebridge International merged in 2009 with The Albright Group, a similar firm founded by former Secretary of State Madeleine Albright, to form Albright Stonebridge Group.

In late 2003, Berger was called to testify before the 9/11 Commission regarding steps taken against terrorism during his tenure and the information he provided to his successor, Condoleezza Rice. At the time, Berger was also acting as an informal foreign policy advisor to Senator John Kerry during his campaign for the presidency. He quit his advisory role after controversy arose regarding his preparations for testifying before the September 11 committee.

Berger was also Chairman of the D.B. Zwirn Global Advisory Board, an international investment fund and merchant capital provider founded in 2001 and with offices throughout North America, Europe and Asia. Berger was an advisory board member for the Partnership for a Secure America, a not-for-profit organization dedicated to recreating the bipartisan center in American national security and foreign policy. He also served on the International Advisory Council of the Brookings Doha Center. Berger served as a foreign policy adviser to Senator Hillary Clinton in her 2008 presidential campaign. Berger served on the board of directors of the International Crisis Group and World Food Program USA, and also on the advisory boards of the National Security Network, and America Abroad Media.

Personal life and death
Berger lived in the American University Park neighborhood of Washington, D.C., was married to Susan Harrison Berger, and had three children.

Berger died of cancer in Washington, D.C., on December 2, 2015, at the age of 70, more than a year after being diagnosed.

President Barack Obama released the following statement on learning of Berger's death:

Awards
In November 2015, Berger was awarded the Grand Cordon of the Order of the Rising Sun by the Japanese government for his contributions to promotion of a strong and friendly relationship between the United States and Japan, particularly in his role as National Security Adviser to President Clinton. He also provided legal and commercial advice to the Embassy of Japan in Washington, D.C.

On December 1, 2015, World Food Program USA announced that it has given its inaugural Global Humanitarian Award to Samuel R. Berger in recognition of his decades of leadership helping families in need across the globe. Additionally, the World Food Program USA established the Samuel R. Berger Humanitarian Fund, which will support humanitarian organizations as they work to eradicate hunger around the world.

In 2000, Berger was presented with an honorary degree  from Tel Aviv University in Israel.

See also
 History of the United States National Security Council 1993–present
 Iraq disarmament timeline 1990–2003
 Mary McCarthy (CIA)

References

External links

 United States National Security Council page at the White House website
 Report on Berger (PDF), Office of the Inspector General, National Archives and Records Administration

|-

1945 births
2015 deaths
American male criminals
American foreign policy writers
American male non-fiction writers
American lobbyists
American political consultants
American political commentators
Deaths from cancer in Washington, D.C.
Clinton administration personnel
Cornell University alumni
Disbarred American lawyers
Harvard Law School alumni
Jewish American government officials
New York (state) Democrats
New York (state) lawyers
People from Millerton, New York
United States National Security Advisors
2000 millennium attack plots
United States Deputy National Security Advisors